A corner retirement or corner stoppage – abbreviated "RTD (Retired)" by BoxRec – are terms used in boxing to describe a fight that ends when, during any rest period between rounds, a boxer refuses to continue or their corner pulls them out, thereby forcing the referee to call an end to the fight. In contrast, a technical knockout (TKO) may only be declared by the referee or ringside doctor, at any stage of the fight including rest periods. In either case, an RTD still counts as a type of knockout, and is displayed as a stoppage result on a boxer's win/loss record.

One of the most notable corner stoppages in boxing occurred during the Muhammad Ali vs. Sonny Liston fight on February 25, 1964, the first of their two fights. After six back-and-forth rounds, Sonny Liston, complaining of a shoulder injury, refused to get up from his stool for the seventh round. As a result, Ali became the world heavyweight champion.

References

Boxing rules and regulations